Argopatagus vitreus is a species of sea urchin of the family Macropneustidae. Their armour is covered with spines. It is placed in the genus Argopatagus and lives in the sea. Argopatagus vitreus was first scientifically described in 1879 by Alexander Emanuel Agassiz, an American scientist.

See also 
 Arbaciella elegans
 Argopatagus planus
 Aspidodiadema africanum

References 

Spatangoida
Animals described in 1879